Sylvie Bernier, CM, CQ (born January 31, 1964) is an Olympic athlete from Sainte-Foy, Quebec, Canada. She won the gold medal in the Women's 3m Springboard Diving at the 1984 Summer Olympics in Los Angeles.

Bernier announced her retirement from competitive diving in December 1984 and accepted a position as an advisor for the federal Department of Fitness and Amateur Sport. Immediately following her retirement, she began volunteering as a technical advisor with the association's youth development program in January 1985.

In June 1985, she was made a Knight of the National Order of Quebec and a Member of the Order of Canada, Canada's highest civilian honour.

She served as Assistant Chef de Mission for the Canadian Olympic Team at the 2006 Winter Olympics in Turin, Italy (Torino).  She served as the Chef de Mission  for Canada at the 2008 Olympic Games in Beijing, China and served again as Assistant Chef de Mission for the 2012 Olympic Games in London, United Kingdom .

She earned a degree in management from Télé-université (a component of UQAM) in 2003.

Medals
 1982 – Commonwealth Games → Silver
 1983 – Pan-American Games → Bronze
 1983 – FINA World Cup → Bronze
 1983 – World University Games → Bronze
 1984 – Summer Olympics → Gold

See also
 List of members of the International Swimming Hall of Fame

References

External links
 

1964 births
Living people
Olympic divers of Canada
Divers at the 1984 Summer Olympics
French Quebecers
Knights of the National Order of Quebec
Members of the Order of Canada
Olympic gold medalists for Canada
People from Sainte-Foy, Quebec City
Divers from Quebec City
Olympic medalists in diving
Université du Québec à Montréal alumni
Divers at the 1982 Commonwealth Games
Commonwealth Games silver medallists for Canada
Canadian female divers
Medalists at the 1984 Summer Olympics
Pan American Games bronze medalists for Canada
Commonwealth Games medallists in diving
Pan American Games medalists in diving
Universiade medalists in diving
Divers at the 1983 Pan American Games
Universiade bronze medalists for Canada
Laval Rouge et Or athletes
Medalists at the 1983 Summer Universiade
Medalists at the 1983 Pan American Games
Medallists at the 1982 Commonwealth Games